Cooper is a male given name of English origin meaning “barrel maker”

People with the given name

 Cooper Carlisle (born 1977), American professional football player
 Cooper Cronk (born 1983), Australian rugby league player
 Cooper Edens (born 1945), American author and illustrator of children's books
 Cooper Huckabee (born 1951), American film and television actor
 Cooper Kupp (born 1993), American football player
 Cooper Manning (born 1974), American sports television host and oldest son of Archie Manning and older brother of Peyton Manning and Eli Manning
 Cooper Rawson (1876–1946), British businessman and member of Parliament
 Cooper Smeaton (1890–1978), Canadian professional ice hockey referee and head coach
 Cooper Snyder, member of the Ohio Senate 1979–1996
 Cooper Vuna (born 1987), New Zealand rugby league player
 Cooper Wallace (born 1982), American professional football player
 Peter Cooper Hewitt (1861–1921), American electrical engineer and inventor

Fictional characters with the given name
 Cooper (video game character), in Dino Crisis
 Cooper Freedman, character on the Grey's Anatomy spin-off, Private Practice
 Cooper Daniels, a young technopath and supporting character from the American animated series Ben 10 franchise 
 Cooper, a troll from the 2016 animated film Trolls

See also
 Cooper (disambiguation)
 Cooper (surname)

References

Masculine given names
English masculine given names